The Maiestas Carolina was a legal code proposed by Charles IV, Holy Roman Emperor in 1350 to govern Bohemia. It received its name not before 1617.

Based on previous legal customs and the Liber Augustalis of 1231, the aim of the code was to increase royal power.  Included among its provisions were sections granting the right to judge criminal cases solely to the king and others allowing the king greater control over functionaries in order to increase royal revenues.  The code also contained sections regarding forest conservation.

The Bohemian Diet resented the loss of their own power and opposed the code.  Charles withdrew the code in 1355, and it never came into effect.

Bibliography 

edited by František Palacký, in: Archiv český 3 (1844), p. 65-180.

14th century in Bohemia
1350 in Europe
1350s in law